Carlos Hidalgo may refer to:

Carlos Hidalgo (footballer, born 1979), Ecuadorian football midfielder
Carlos Hidalgo (footballer, born 1986), Colombian football striker